Alicia pretiosa is a species of sea anemone in the family Aliciidae and can be found in the Red Sea and South Pacific Ocean.

References

Aliciidae
Animals described in 1846